The white-headed marsh tyrant (Arundinicola leucocephala), also known as simply the marsh tyrant, is a small passerine bird in the tyrant flycatcher family, the only species of the genus Arundinicola. It breeds in tropical South America from Colombia, Venezuela and Trinidad south to Bolivia, Argentina and Paraguay.

Description 
The adult white-headed marsh tyrant is 12.7 cm long and weighs 15 g. The male is entirely brown-black, apart from the relatively large white head and yellowish lower mandible. The female has brown upperparts and wings and a black tail. Her underparts, sides of the head and forecrown are dull white. This is a quiet species, but the call is a sharp sedik.

This species is found in marshy savannahs, reedbeds and the edges of mangrove swamps.

Diet 
White-headed marsh tyrants wait on an exposed low perch in marsh vegetation or a branch near water, occasionally sallying out to feed on insects, their staple diet, before returning to the perch. They often pick off insects from the vegetation, but more frequently out of mid-air and even from shallow water. Insects preyed upon include dragonflies, grasshoppers, froghoppers and beetles.

The nest is a feather-lined oval ball of grasses and other plant material, with a porched side entrance. It is placed at the end of a branch near or over water. Both sexes incubate the typical clutch of two or three creamy-white eggs, which are marked with a few brown spots. Cowbirds often parasitise the nest.

This bird is not considered threatened by the IUCN. Local populations may disappear however due to declining habitat quality.

Footnotes

References 
 de A. Gabriel, Vagner & Pizo, Marco A. (2005): Foraging behavior of tyrant flycatchers (Aves, Tyrannidae) in Brazil. Revista Brasileira de Zoologia 22(4): 1072–1077.  PDF fulltext
 Faria, Christiana M.A.; Rodrigues, Marcos; do Amaral, Frederico Q.; Módena, Érica & Fernandes, Alexandre M. (2006): Aves de um fragmento de Mata Atlântica no alto Rio Doce, Minas Gerais: colonização e extinção [The birds of an Atlantic Forest fragment at upper Rio Doce valley, Minas Gerais, southeastern Brazil: colonization and extinction]. Revista Brasileira de Zoologia 23(4): 1217-1230 [Portuguese with English abstract].  PDF fulltext
 ffrench, Richard; O'Neill, John Patton & Eckelberry, Don R. (1991): A guide to the birds of Trinidad and Tobago (2nd edition). Comstock Publishing, Ithaca, N.Y.. 
 Hilty, Steven L. (2003): Birds of Venezuela. Christopher Helm, London.

External links
"White-headed marsh tyrant" videos on the Internet Bird Collection
"White-headed marsh tyrant" photo gallery VIREO
Photo-High Res; Article-w/photos
Photo-High Res; Article geometer–"Brazil Photos"

white-headed marsh tyrant
Birds of Colombia
Birds of Venezuela
Birds of the Guianas
Birds of Trinidad and Tobago
Birds of the Amazon Basin
Birds of Paraguay
Birds of Bolivia
Birds of the Pantanal
Birds of South America
white-headed marsh tyrant
Birds of Brazil
Taxa named by Carl Linnaeus